Duel Masters is a strategy video game released in late 2004 by Atari. It was made for the PlayStation 2 and is based on the Duel Masters trading card game franchise.

Reception 

Duel Masters received "average" reviews according to the review aggregation website Metacritic.

References

External links 
 

2004 video games
Strategy video games
Atari games
Video games based on anime and manga
PlayStation 2 games
High Voltage Software games
Multiplayer and single-player video games